A follower plate pump is a device to pump highly viscous material directly from barrels. So it sometimes is called a barrel follower plate pump.
It is applied in food manufacturing, resin dispensing, gluing and so on.

The principle 
If an ordinary intake socket is lowered into highly viscous material, the material will flow so slowly, that after short time, the pump will soak up air, because the socket is not fully covered by the material anymore. To avoid that, a plate, closing tight to the wall of the barrel by a soft sealing lip, is put on top of the material in the barrel. This plate is lowered slowly so that the material rises through a hole in the center of the plate into the intake socket. The pumped amount and the amount lifted through the plate have to be precisely the same. This must be ensured by appropriate control of the follower plate.

In such a device a scooping piston pump or an eccentric screw pump can be used for pumping the stiff paste.

Fundamental problems 
To get rid of enclosed air when changing barrels, quite some material has to be pressed out of the barrel, causing a significant amount of waste.

The follower plate can be lowered too fast in such a way, that material is squeezed out at the side instead of being raised in the center.

Hardened material on the edge of the sealing lip of the follower plate can be carried into the material, causing waste of produced parts or process breakdown.

Pumps